Mark Brennock is an Irish 'Director of Public Affairs' and a former journalist. He used to work for The Irish Times.

He was educated in University College Dublin (B.A. Economics and Politics) and Dublin City University (Journalism). Until 2006, he served as chief political correspondent for The Irish Times. During a 20-year career as a journalist, he also served as Northern editor, deputy news editor and foreign affairs correspondent at the paper. He won four national awards for journalism. Stephen Collins was appointed as his successor at the paper.

He left the Irish Times in 2006 to become 'Director of Public Affairs' at Murray Consultants, advising public and private sector clients on relationships with media and government.

References

Year of birth missing (living people)
Living people
Alumni of Dublin City University
Alumni of University College Dublin
The Irish Times people
People educated at C.B.C. Monkstown